Dean Thomas may refer to:

Dean Thomas (footballer) (born 1961), former manager of Hinckley United
Dean Thomas (motorcycle racer) (born 1973), motorcycle racer from Australia
Dean Thomas (rugby league), an English rugby league coach and former player
Dean Thomas (Harry Potter), character from the Harry Potter series

See also
Thomas Dean (disambiguation)